Bakonyoszlop is a village in the Bakony Mountains of Veszprém county, Hungary in Zirc District.

External links

 Street map (Hungarian)

Populated places in Zirc District